United Nations Security Council Resolution 14, adopted on December 16, 1946, changed the rules of procedure so that the terms of the rotating presidency of the Council would correspond with the calendar year. Additionally, the terms of elected members of the Security Council were decided to commence on January 1 and end on December 31.

The resolution was adopted with 9 votes, with abstentions from the Soviet Union and United States.

See also
 List of United Nations Security Council Resolutions 1 to 100 (1946–1953)

References
Text of the Resolution at undocs.org

External links
 

 0014
 0014
December 1946 events